Jeffrey Jensen is an American attorney who served as the United States Attorney for the United States District Court for the Eastern District of Missouri from 2017 to 2020.

Private sector career 
Prior to becoming the U.S. Attorney, he was a partner at Husch Blackwell LLP.  Jensen has also served as a Certified Public Accountant for PricewaterhouseCoopers.

Government career 
Jensen was a Federal Bureau of Investigation special agent from 1989 to 1999. In 1999, he became an Assistant United States Attorney in the Eastern District of Missouri. He was an Executive United States Attorney from 2005 to 2009, leaving that position in order to start his own law firm.

United States Attorney (2017-2020) 
In 2020, Jensen was chosen by Attorney General William Barr to conduct a review of the Department of Justice's case against former National Security Advisor Michael Flynn in the United States v. Flynn case. In this position, Jensen recommended that the federal government drop its case against Flynn. He resigned as a United States Attorney on December 30, 2020.

References

External links
 Biography at U.S. Department of Justice
 Biography at law.com

21st-century American lawyers
Assistant United States Attorneys
Federal Bureau of Investigation agents
Indiana University alumni
Living people
Missouri lawyers
Saint Louis University School of Law alumni
United States Attorneys for the Eastern District of Missouri
Year of birth missing (living people)